XCH is a three-letter acronym that can mean:
an EXCHANGE instruction in the IBM 1130 and the Apollo Guidance Computer
 The IATA airport code for Christmas Island Airport